"Jos elämä ois helppoo" ("If Life Were Easy") is a Finnish-language song by Finnish pop rock band Haloo Helsinki!. The song peaked at number 25 on the Official Finnish Download Chart.

Charts

References

External links
 

2009 singles
2009 songs
EMI Records singles
Finnish-language songs
Haloo Helsinki! songs